Dubai Snowdome was a proposed indoor ski resort located in Dubailand. The project was to be financed and developed by 32Group. The construction and opening date was indefinitely halted due to the almost complete scrapping of the Dubailand project, due to the global financial meltdown of the late 2000s.

Development
The snowdome would be surrounded by eleven towers, nine being residential, and two being crystal decoration. The snowdome would also contained a rotating ski deck, a training area, ice rink for recreational skiing, toboggan area, and a snow play area for children.

See also
Ski Dubai

External links
Dubai Snowdome TEN Real Estate

Dubailand
Unbuilt buildings and structures in Dubai